"Sky Walker" is a song by American singer Miguel featuring fellow American singer and rapper Travis Scott. It was written by the two artists with Rogét Chahayed and Happy Perez, who produced it with Miguel. The song was released through ByStorm Entertainment and RCA Records on August 25, 2017, as the lead single from Miguel's fourth studio album, War & Leisure. A Spanish version of the song was included on his extended play Te Lo Dije (2019).

Critical reception
Lauren O'Neill of Vice wrote that the song has "a super chilled-out, laid back vibe in the vein that Miguel always does best". Mikey Fresh of Vibe thinks that the song, which he described as "trippy", "takes listeners on a smoked-out voyage complete with kush clouds and outer-body experiences". Carl Lamarre of Billboard called it a "celebratory song". Jordan Sargent of Spin described the song as "light and airy". He compared the song to Miguel's previous collaboration with Scott on a remix of "Waves", and opined that "Sky Walker" is "more organic". Michelle Geslani of Consequence of Sound wrote that "the two recapture the lushness of" the "Waves" remix. Mitch Findlay of HotNewHipHop regarded the song as "a solid blend of party track and introspective banger". Joshua Espinoza of Pigeons and Planes wrote that the song is "everything you'd expect from a Miguel record: Smooth and airy with an infectious beat that can easily be bumped in a club". Michael Cuby of Paper called it an "oddly perky song", and wrote that "the whole thing is quintessential end-of-the-summer BBQ vibes". Ryan Reed of Rolling Stone named it "a synth-driven new single" and wrote that it has "a trap-leaning beat, accented with splashes of color from a delayed electric guitar".

Commercial performance
"Sky Walker" is Miguel's second-highest-charting single as a lead artist, on the Billboard Hot 100, only behind 2012's "Adorn". It is his fifth-highest-charting single as a lead artist on the Billboard Hot R&B/Hip-Hop Songs chart.

Music video
The accompanying music video was directed by Director X and Miguel. It shows Miguel in various locations such as a sauna, a basketball court, and a cockpit, as he parties inside the mansion, doing activities like surfing, "pouring out shots, stacking cups on a passed out friend's head, pretending to be a matador" and taking pictures in a bedroom. It also features both Miguel and Scott performing part of the song on top of a Toronto Police Services Ford Interceptor Sedan.

Track listing
 Digital download
 "Sky Walker" (featuring Travis Scott) – 4:20
 Digital download – Spanish version
 "Sky Walker" (Spanish version) – 3:10

Credits and personnel
Credits adapted from Tidal.
 Miguel – songwriting, production, engineering, programming
 Travis Scott – songwriting
 Happy Perez – songwriting, production, keyboard, guitar, programming
 Rogét Chahayed – songwriting, keyboard, programming
 David Davis – mixer, engineer
 Bo Bodnar – assistant engineering

Charts

Weekly charts

Year-end charts

Certifications

References

2017 songs
2017 singles
Miguel (singer) songs
Travis Scott songs
Songs written by Travis Scott
RCA Records singles
Songs written by Miguel (singer)
Songs written by Rogét Chahayed
Songs written by Happy Perez
Music videos directed by Director X